The Epang Palace was a Chinese palace complex built during the reign of Qin Shi Huang, the first emperor of China and the founder of the short-lived Qin dynasty. It is located in western Xi’an, Shaanxi Province. Archaeologists believe that only the front hall was completed before the capital was sacked in 206 BCE.

Name
There are three common pronunciations of the name: Epeng, Efang, and Afang. Which pronunciation should be regarded as "correct" has been subject of much debate, with the Kangxi Dictionary advocating for Epeng, and the Guifan Dictionary advocating for Efang.

The Han dynasty historian Sima Qian does not explain what the name means, but the later commentator Yan Shigu provides three possible explanations. The first is that the name refers to the broadness of the rooms (fang) of the palace. The second that e is a local name for a hill, and the name is meant to suggest the height of a room on a hill. The third is that the character fang is sometimes pronounced pang, meaning by the side, and the palace was named for being by the side of the Qin capital Xianyang.

History

After Qin Shi Huang forcibly united the Warring States in 221 BCE, he took a number of measures to establish his authority, including giving himself a title – commonly translated into English as "Emperor" — that was previously used only for semi-divine figures. Among these efforts included a number of grand construction projects, such as building roads and defensive walls. One such project was to be the building of a grand palace on the south bank of the Wei River, outside the capital at Xianyang. The layout of the palace was meant to reflect cosmological principles.

Construction of the palace began in 212 BCE, and continued after Qin Shi Huang died two years later, although work had to be delayed for a year to focus on the construction of the late emperor's tomb at Mount Li. Qin Shi Huang's son and successor Qin Er Shi has been judged by history to be an ineffectual ruler, leading to a great weakening of Qin's power. After a complicated and bloody series of power struggles, Qin Er Shi was forced to commit suicide by his formerly trusted eunuch Zhao Gao, and thereafter the Qin dynasty collapsed. According to Sima Qian, when the anti-Qin rebel and Chu aristocrat Xiang Yu entered the already-surrendered capital Xianyang a year later in 206 BCE, the city was sacked and the palaces of Qin were burned to the ground. While Sima Qian does not mention it explicitly, it was long assumed throughout history that Epang Palace burnt with them.

In his Records of the Grand Historian, Sima Qian described the dimensions of the palace as being 693m long × 116.5m wide, but modern studies of the ruins have shown that its rammed earth foundation platform measured 1,320m east to west, 420m north to south, and 8m in height. Archaeologists have suggested the dimensions in Sima Qian's account are meant to be understood as referring to plans for the eventual size of the palace, had its construction not been halted, hence the discrepancy.

Cultural references

Since Sima Qian's account of the destruction of the palace by Xiang Yu, the palace has been a symbol of the end of the Qin dynasty, with many writers emphasising the poignancy of its opulence being lost in the blaze. The Tang poet Du Mu wrote a notable rhapsody on the palace, the end of which reads:
{|
! style="width:12em;"|
! style="width:45em;"|
|-
|
秦人不暇自哀
而後人哀之
後人哀之
而不鑒之
亦使後人
而復哀後人也
|
The people of Qin had not a moment to lament their fate
Those who came after lamented it
When those who come after lament
But do not learn
Then they too will merely provide
Fresh cause for lamentation
From those who come after them.

|}

The palace was also the subject of paintings by the Qing dynasty painter Yuan Yao and the Japanese painter Kimura Buzan, the latter of whom depicted the palace's destruction.

Archaeology

The exact location of Epang Palace was not recorded in Sima Qian's Records of the Grand Historian, although a number of suggestions were made in other texts. The archaeological site was first discovered in 1923, based on local reports. After the interruption of World War Two and the subsequent civil war in China, Su Bingqi and He Shixing were able to confirm the location, and after many decades of excavations, it was confirmed that possibly only the front hall was constructed during the Qin dynasty, contradicting literary accounts of an opulent palace. Archaeologists believe that possibly only a wall was built upon the rammed earth foundations during the early period.

Since 1961, the site of the palace has been listed as a Major Historical and Cultural Site Protected at the National Level (1-151).

See also 
 Unfinished building
 Chinese palace

External links 
 Epang Palace Site (engl.)
 Zerstörte Legende vom Epang- Palast (engl.)
 Der Aufstand von Chen Sheng und Wu Guang
 Protected Sites:Epang Palace Site

References 

Palaces in China
Qin dynasty
History of Xi'an
Buildings and structures in Xi'an
Unfinished buildings and structures
Qin Shi Huang
Major National Historical and Cultural Sites in Shaanxi